The Sociedade Brasileira de Geologia is a technical and scientific society that aims brings to bring together Brazilian geologists, to  disseminate technical and scientific information, and to participate in national decisions involving the geological sciences.

Publications
The major publication of the society is the Brazilian Journal of Geology (formerly Revista Brasileira de Geociências) which is a quarterly publication established in 1971. It superseded the now defunct SBG Bulletin which had been published since 1952.

Prizes 
The society awards a number of prizes including the José Bonifácio de Andrada e Silva award (named after José Bonifácio de Andrada). This prize is awarded to honour those who have contributed to the development and advancement of geological knowledge and acted in the interests of the society.

José Bonifácio de Andrada e Silva Prize winners

References

External links 
 
 Revista Brasileira de Geociências

Geology societies
Scientific organisations based in Brazil